Cropwell may refer to:

 Cropwell, Alabama, an unincorporated community in Pell City, Alabama, United States
 Cropwell Bishop, a village in Nottinghamshire, England
 Cropwell Butler, a village in Nottinghamshire, England
 Cropwell, New Jersey, United States, an unincorporated community in Evesham Township, Burlington County
 Cropwell Friends Meeting House, a historic Quaker meeting house in Cropwell
 Cropwell Township, a former name for Maple Shade Township, New Jersey, United States